Bert Chandler may refer to:

 Bert Chandler (Australian footballer) (1913–1961), Australian rules footballer
 Bert Chandler (footballer, born 1897) (1897–1963), English football right back
 Bert D. Chandler (1869–1947), American jurist